Harry Thomas Keramidas (born August 31, 1940) is an American film and television editor. He is perhaps best known for his work in the Back to the Future film trilogy, co-editing with Arthur Schmidt. He has also edited the films Children of the Corn, About Last Night..., The Favor, Judge Dredd, among other films. 

He is alumnus of University of Michigan and Wayne State University, graduating with a degree in Industrial psychology. He also studied ethnographic filmmaking at UCLA School of Theater, Film and Television.

Filmography

Film editor
 2015: Back to the Future: Doc Brown Saves the World (short film)
 2010: Speck's Last (short film)
 2007: The Final Season
 2006: The Hunt
 2005: The Sandlot 2 (direct-to-video film)
 2005: Deacons for Defense (TV film)
 2005: Three Moons Over Milford (TV series)
 2004: The Difference (video documentary short)
 2003: Wilder Days (TV film)
 2003: National Lampoon's Barely Legal 2001: Tomcats 2000: Beethoven's 3rd (direct-to-video film)
 2000: Brooklyn Sonnet 1997: Hoodlum 1997: Contact (additional editor)
 1997: Desert's Edge (TV short film)
 1996: First Kid 1995: Judge Dredd 1995: Man of the House 1994: The Favor 1993: The Princess and the Cobbler (additional editor: Los Angeles)
 1993: Attack of the 50 Ft. Woman (TV film)
 1993: Johnny Bago (TV series, 2 episodes)
 1992: Passed Away 1991: Tales from the Crypt (TV series, 1 episode)
 1990: Back to the Future Part III 1989: Back to the Future Part II 1989: Chances Are 1988: Big Business 1987: The Squeeze 1986: About Last Night... 1985: Back to the Future 1984: Children of the Corn 1984: The Jerk, Too (TV film)
 1983: Touched 1983: American Playhouse (TV series, 1 episode)
 1981: The Children Nobody Wanted (TV film)
 1981: Bustin' Loose 1980: Homeward Bound (TV film)
 1980: Scared Straight! Another Story (TV film)
 1979: Goldengirl 1978: Dracula's Dog 1977–1978: The Hardy Boys/Nancy Drew Mysteries (TV series, 2 episodes)
 1977: Crash! 1976: Mansion of the Doomed 1976: Massacre at Central High 1975: Chac 1974: Memory of UsSound editor
 1980: Ordinary People (dialogue editor, uncredited)
 1977: New York, New York'' (sound editor)

References

External links
 

1940 births
Living people
American film editors
People from Detroit
American television editors
UCLA Film School alumni
University of Michigan people
Wayne State University alumni
University of Michigan alumni